The following are lists of New Zealanders'''.

Academia
List of New Zealand university leaders

Actors
 List of New Zealand actors
 List of former child actors from New Zealand

Architecture 
 List of New Zealand architects

Art
 List of New Zealand artists
 List of New Zealand women artists

Broadcasters
List of New Zealand broadcasters

Business
List of New Zealand businesspeople

Craft, design and fashion 
List of New Zealand designers and artisans

Film
 List of New Zealand film directors
 See also Actors

Inventors
 List of New Zealand inventors

Executed
 List of people executed in New Zealand

Literary
 List of New Zealand poets
 List of New Zealand writers
 New Zealand blogosphere

Māori
Māori people
 List of Māori composers

Medicine
List of New Zealand doctors

Military
 List of New Zealand military people
 List of World War II aces from New Zealand

Music
 List of New Zealand musicians
 List of New Zealand composers

Police
 List of New Zealand police officers killed in the line of duty

Politics
 List of New Zealand politicians
 List of governors-general of New Zealand
 List of prime ministers of New Zealand
 List of prime ministers of New Zealand by age
 List of prime ministers of New Zealand by place of birth
 Left-wing activists in New Zealand
 List of members of the New Zealand Parliament who died in office

Religion
 Lists of New Zealand religious leaders
 Congregation of Christian Brothers in New Zealand
 List of New Zealand Catholics

Science
 List of New Zealand scientists
 List of New Zealand women botanists

Sports
 List of New Zealand sportspeople
 List of New Zealand double-international sportspeople
 New Zealand Olympic medallists
 List of New Zealand Twenty20 International cricketers
 List of New Zealand ODI cricketers
 List of New Zealand Test cricketers
 List of New Zealand international footballers
 List of New Zealand Kiwis representatives
 List of New Zealand national rugby union footballers

By ethnicity or descent 
 List of New Zealanders of Chinese descent
 List of New Zealanders of Italian descent
 List of Pakistani New Zealanders

Other lists
 New Zealand Listener Power List
 New Zealand's Top 100 History Makers
 Notable Alumni of St Peter's College, Auckland
 List of former staff of St Peter's College, Auckland
 List of people on stamps of New Zealand
 List of South Islanders
 List of people by nationality
 List of New Zealand suffragists

See also

 Lists of people by nationality

External links

NZEdge Heroes - Contains the biographies of many famous New Zealanders